The Junior TT is a motorcycle road race that takes place during the Isle of Man TT festival; an annual event at the end of May and beginning of June. Between 1949 and 1976 this race was part of the Grand Prix motorcycle racing season.

Engine capacity
The 1911 Isle of Man TT was the first time the Junior TT race took place and was open to 300cc single-cylinder and 340cc twin cylinder motor-cycles and was contested over 5 laps of the new 37.5 mile Mountain Course. The first event on the new course was the Junior TT Race and was contested by 35 entrants. It was won by Percy J. Evans riding a Humber motor-cycle in 3 hours, 37 minutes and 7 seconds at an average speed of 41.45 mph.

The 1912 event was the first to limit the Junior TT to only 350 cc machines and this engine capacity prevailed until 1994.

Eligibility

Entrants
 Entrants must be in possession of a valid National Entrants or FIM Sponsors Licence for Road Racing.

Machines
The 2012 specification for entries into the Junior TT race are defined as;-
 Any machine complying with the following specifications:
 Supersport TT: (Machines complying with the 2012 FIM Supersport Championships specifications)
 Over 400cc up to 600cc 4 cylinders 4-stroke
 Over 600cc up to 675cc 3 cylinders 4-stroke
 Over 600cc up to 750cc 2 cylinders 4-stroke

Official Qualification Time
 115% of the time set by the third fastest qualifier in the class.

Speed and Lap Records
The lap record for the Junior TT is 17 minutes and 31.328 seconds, at an average speed of  set by Michael Dunlop on lap 2 of the 2018 Isle of Man TT 600cc Supersport Junior TT Race 1. The race record for a four-lap Junior TT is 1 hour, 11 minutes and 28.059 seconds at an average race speed of  set by Dean Harrison during the 2018 600cc Supersport TT Race 2.

List of Junior/Supersport TT Winners

Race winners (riders)

Race winners (manufacturers)

Winners of Junior/Senior Double Isle of Man TT Races

References

See also
TT Zero
Lightweight TT
Ultra-Lightweight TT
Sidecar TT
Superstock TT
Senior TT